Awa Traoré may refer to:

Awa Traoré (actress), Malian filmmaker and actress
Awa Traoré (footballer) (born 2000), Malian footballer